Azhakulla Saleena is a 1973 Indian Malayalam-language film, based on the novel of the same name by Muttathu Varkey, directed by K. S. Sethumadhavan and produced by K. S. R. Moorthy. The film stars Prem Nazir, Jayabharathi, Kanchana and Vincent in the lead roles. The film had musical score by K. J. Yesudas. The film is best known for the performance by Prem Nazir in a negative role. This is one of the two films in which he acted as a villain along with Nayattu (1980).

Cast

Prem Nazir as Kunjachan
Jayabharathi as Saleena
Kanchana as Lucyamma
Vincent as Johnny
KPAC Lalitha as Mary
Sankaradi as Agausthi
Sreelatha Namboothiri as Tribal Girl
T. R. Omana as Chinnamma
Baby Sumathi as Sajan
Bahadoor as Diamond Mathai
Changanacherry Thankam
Kavitha
Pala Thankam
Ramadas as Avarachan 
S. P. Pillai as Paappi 
Vanchiyoor Radha
Santo Krishnan as Police Constable
Abbas
Ramadas as Awarachan
K. A. Vasudevan

Soundtrack
The music was composed by K. J. Yesudas and the lyrics were written by Vayalar Ramavarma and Father Nagel.

References

External links
 

1973 films
1970s Malayalam-language films
1970s romance films
Films directed by K. S. Sethumadhavan
Indian romance films